

Marc Burns (born 7 January 1983) is an athlete from Trinidad and Tobago specializing in the 100 metres and the 4 x 100 metres relay.

Participating in the 2004 Summer Olympics, he was disqualified from his 100 metres heat due to a false start, thus failing to make it through to the second round.

Marc Burns placed second in the men's 100 metres dash at the Bislett Games IAAF Golden League meet in Oslo in July 2005, in preparation for the 2005 World Championships in Athletics. At the 2005 World Championships he won (together with Kevon Pierre, Jacey Harper and Darrel Brown) a silver medal. Later that year he won the World Athletics Final.

At the 2006 Commonwealth Games he won a bronze medal over 100 metres.

He was a finalist in the 100 m final at the 2007 World Championships in Osaka.

At the London Grand Prix he ran a season's best time of 9.97 seconds coming second behind former world record holder Asafa Powell.

In the 2008 Summer Olympics he competed at the 100 metres sprint and placed 2nd in his heat after Samuel Francis in a time of 10.46 seconds. He qualified for the second round in which he improved his time to 10.05 seconds, winning his race with opponents as Kim Collins and Tyrone Edgar. In the semi finals he finished 3rd (9.97 seconds) in his heat behind Usain Bolt and Walter Dix and qualified for the final. There he finished his race in 7th place in a time of 10.01 seconds. Together with Keston Bledman, Aaron Armstrong and Richard Thompson he also competed at the 4x100 metres relay. In their qualification heat they placed first in front of Japan, the Netherlands and Brazil. Their time of 38.26 was the fastest of all sixteen teams participating in the first round and they qualified for the final. Armstrong was replaced by Emmanuel Callender for the final race and they sprinted to a time of 38.06 seconds, the second time after the Jamaican team, winning the silver medal. In 2022, Burns and his teammates received the gold medal due to Jamaica's Nesta Carter testing positive for the prohibited substance methylhexaneamine.

At the 2012 Summer Olympics, he was part of the Trinidad and Tobago team that won the silver medal in the men's 4 × 100 m relay.  He was also part of the team that won the bronze medal at the 2014 Commonwealth Games.

Burns was coached most of his professional career by Henry Rolle.

Personal bests

Outdoor

Indoor

References

External links
 
 Report on Bislett Games Golden League in Oslo, July 2005

1983 births
Living people
Trinidad and Tobago male sprinters
Olympic athletes of Trinidad and Tobago
Olympic silver medalists for Trinidad and Tobago
Athletes (track and field) at the 2000 Summer Olympics
Athletes (track and field) at the 2004 Summer Olympics
Athletes (track and field) at the 2008 Summer Olympics
Athletes (track and field) at the 2012 Summer Olympics
Medalists at the 2012 Summer Olympics
Medalists at the 2008 Summer Olympics
Pan American Games medalists in athletics (track and field)
Athletes (track and field) at the 2003 Pan American Games
Commonwealth Games medallists in athletics
Commonwealth Games bronze medallists for Trinidad and Tobago
Athletes (track and field) at the 2002 Commonwealth Games
Athletes (track and field) at the 2006 Commonwealth Games
Athletes (track and field) at the 2014 Commonwealth Games
Athletes (track and field) at the 2018 Commonwealth Games
World Athletics Championships athletes for Trinidad and Tobago
World Athletics Championships medalists
Alumni of Queen's Royal College, Trinidad
Pan American Games silver medalists for Trinidad and Tobago
Olympic silver medalists in athletics (track and field)
Central American and Caribbean Games gold medalists for Trinidad and Tobago
Competitors at the 2010 Central American and Caribbean Games
Olympic gold medalists for Trinidad and Tobago
Central American and Caribbean Games medalists in athletics
Medalists at the 2003 Pan American Games
Medallists at the 2006 Commonwealth Games
Medallists at the 2014 Commonwealth Games